The 201st Independent Infantry Brigade (Home) was a short-lived Home Defence formation of the British Army during the Second World War.

Formation and Service
The 201st Independent Infantry Brigade was formed for service in the United Kingdom on 4 October 1940 by No 1 Infantry Training Group in Aldershot Command. It was commanded by Brigadier A.E. Lawrence, and comprised four newly raised infantry battalions from Southern England. 'Home' brigades had a purely static defence role.

Service
The brigade moved from Aldershot Command to XII Corps on 10 October and then briefly to the West Sussex County Division (on 9 November), then to the Yorkshire Area (Military District) (on 21 February 1941), then to the Yorkshire County Division on 19 March, after that was formed on 24 February. The Yorkshire County Division was re-designated the East Riding Coastal Area on 1 December and the brigade went with it until it was disbanded on 13 December.

Order of battle
The composition of 201st Brigade was as follows:
 13th Battalion, Queen's Royal Regiment (West Surrey) – joined 4 October 1940, left 25 November 1941; later to 211th Bde
 14th Battalion, Queen's Royal Regiment (West Surrey) – formed 4 July 1940 at Dorchester, Dorset, joined 4 October 1940, left 3 June 1941, converted on 1 December that year into 99th Light Anti-Aircraft Regiment, Royal Artillery
 9th Battalion, Hampshire Regiment – formed 4 July 1940, joined 4 October 1940, left 5 December 1941 to be converted into 157th Regiment Royal Armoured Corps
 10th Battalion, Hampshire Regiment –  formed 4 July 1940 at Aldershot, joined 4 October 1940, left 25 November 1941 to be converted into 147th Regiment Royal Armoured Corps

Notes

References
 J.B.M. Frederick, Lineage Book of British Land Forces 1660–1978, Vol I, Wakefield: Microform Academic, 1984, .
 

Military units and formations established in 1940
Infantry brigades of the British Army
Infantry brigades of the British Army in World War II
Military units and formations disestablished in 1941